Playa del Fuego, also known as "PDF" by its participants, is a regional event inspired by the annual Burning Man festival in Nevada. The event is held in the Mid-Atlantic region twice a year, with the spring event (PDF) being held over Memorial Day and the fall event (Constellation) being held over Columbus Day weekend. Most of the planners and participants come from the Baltimore-Washington, D.C. metropolitan area and surrounding states including Maryland, Virginia, Delaware, Pennsylvania, and New Jersey; though more than a few come from as far away as New England.

Playa del Fuego is a camping event that celebrates art for art's sake and espouses a gift economy where no vending, sales or barter are permitted. Visual and performance artists from all over the mid-atlantic region and the East Coast create a temporary community for the weekend. Participants share a wide range of talents from sculpting, painting, music, theatre, and DJing, to alternative forms of expression such as games, performance art, and circus talents such as juggling and fire spinning.

The event adheres to the ten principles of the Burning Man event in Nevada.  Among these are the LNT (Leave No Trace) philosophy, an environmental policy whereby participants are obligated to remove every piece of refuse that they generate while at the event, taking it with them when they leave. The themes of radical self-expression and radical self-reliance are also borrowed from Burning Man. In addition, the event is considered a "no spectators" event, meaning that all attendees are expected to actively participate in its creation, staffing, and general philosophy.

According to the official website, it is "a celebration of the spirit of radical self-expression, community, and participation". The event is planned and run completely by volunteers.  The volunteer areas include: the PDF Rangers, First Aid, Gate Crew, DPW, LNT, Participation Station, Lamp Lighters, and Sound Patrol.

Gates open for Playa del Fuego Thursday afternoon of Memorial Day weekend.  Playa del Fuego culminates with a bonfire on Saturday night; however, instead of a human effigy as at Burning Man, a wooden pony is burned in honor of the event's origins on Assateague Island in Maryland.  A Fire Conclave and Drum Circle directly precede the main burn.  In recent festivals, a secondary burn has taken place the following night, during which other works of "burnable art" are burned. The event ends on Monday at noon.

History

PDF began with a small group in 1998 on a beach at Assateague Island. Eventually, the event grew too large for that location and moved to private property in the Odessa/Townsend area of Delaware to accommodate the hundreds of participants who were attending the event. In 2018, the event moved to Tamaqua, Pennsylvania

Timeline of the Assateague Beach Burn
The Assateague Beach Burn was the progenitor event of Playa Del Fuego.

Timeline of Playa Del Fuego (since 2000)

Event size and ticketing 

As of spring 2010, the ticket cap was raised to 1,275. Tickets offered for sale on the PDF website generally sell out quickly. The primary factor which prevents the ticket cap from being increased to meet demand is the number of volunteers available to staff various aspects of the event. Over the years, as the volume of volunteers (people x shifts covered) has increased, the ticket cap was increased. Other factors taken into account when raising the ticket cap are the availability of space for parking and the impact of noise on surrounding residents.

Tickets cost US$90 each (though a few hardship ticket scholarships are available by application), and are sold in two releases, with about half the event tickets sold in the first release, and the remaining half sold in the second release. Tickets sales for the spring PDF usually begin mid-March on the event website, and ticket sales for the fall event usually begin in mid-August.

Ethics 
Several themes and/or ethics are encouraged during the event, based on the ten principles of Burning Man. These include:

 Leave No Trace (or LNT) - everyone at the event is asked to clean up after themselves so that when the event is done, the campground's state has not deteriorated.
 Gift Economy - no sale or barter is allowed at the event. Participants are asked to bring what they can and gift as they are able.
 Radical Inclusion - everyone is welcome to be a part of the event.
 Radical Self-Reliance - do what needs to be done and do not be a burden to others.
 Radical Self-Expression - be yourself, however you wish. Allow others to do the same.
 Communal Effort - work together to make the best possible.
 Civic Responsibility - every citizen bears a responsibility to contribute to the community as a whole.
 Participation - no one attending is an observer; no spectators.
 Immediacy - participants are to become part of the event and explore their inner selves in relation to the event and surroundings
 Decommodification - rejection of corporate advertising, branding and sales of any kind.

See also
List of regional Burning Man events

References

External links

Burning Man
Music festivals in Delaware
Tourist attractions in New Castle County, Delaware